Ninglang Luguhu Airport  is an airport serving Ninglang Yi Autonomous County and Lugu Lake (Luguhu), in northwestern Yunnan province, China. Construction began in April 2013, and the airport, the 13th in Yunnan, was opened on 12 October 2015. The airports cost 1.298 billion yuan to build.

Airlines and destinations

See also
List of highest airports

References

Airports in Yunnan
Transport in Lijiang
Airports established in 2015
2015 establishments in China